Leemon is an unincorporated community in Cape Girardeau County, in the U.S. state of Missouri.

The community is on Missouri Route 177 approximately three miles east of Fruitland.

History
A post office called Leemon was established in 1875, and remained in operation until 1905. The community was named after Leemon Hale, the proprietor of a local sawmill.

References

Unincorporated communities in Cape Girardeau County, Missouri
Unincorporated communities in Missouri